Gastón Solnicki (born 1978) is an Argentine film director. Coming from an immigrant Jewish family, he studied photography at International Center of Photography, as well as film directing at Tisch School of the Arts in New York.

His first short was Liliana.Rebecca (2007), a short film made with only two actors. He later made the documentaries Süden (2008) and Papirosen (2011), both of which were critically acclaimed.

His real breakthrough, however, came with Kékszakállú (2016), his first narrative feature, which depicted the coming-of-age of a circle of adolescent girls in Buenos Aires. The film was screened in the Orizzonti section at the 73rd Venice International Film Festival, yet did not win any awards. It was later shown at festivals in Rotterdam, New York, Vancouver and Thessaloniki.

References

External links
 
 Gastón Solnicki at cinenational.com

1978 births
Argentine film directors
Living people
People from Buenos Aires